Main were a British band formed in 1991 by guitarists Robert Hampson and Scott Dowson, both formerly of the English rock band Loop. Drawing on that group's experimentation with drones and guitar texture, the duo moved further into ambient sound, eventually abandoning traditional percussion and rhythm altogether. They released a number of albums and EPs to critical praise in the 1990s. Dawson left the group in 1996.

In 2006, Hampson announced that Main had effectively been disbanded in favour of his solo work. In October 2010, he announced that he would be reactivating Main as a more collaborative process with other sound artists. In 2011, the German composer Stephan Mathieu joined Hampson for a current incarnation of the project.

Discography

Singles, EPs 
 Hydra (12" single 1991)
 Calm (12" EP 1992)
 Dry Stone Feed (12" mini LP/CD 1992)
 Firmament (CD 1993)
 Core (7" single 1994) – limited edition of 300 copies, later released on the Ligature CD
 Ligature – Remixes (12" EP 1994)
 Firmament II (CD 1994)
 "Coderays" (7" single 1995) – limited edition of 100 copies
 Hertz 1 – Corona (12"/mini CD 1995)
 Hertz 2 – Terminus (12"/mini CD 1995)
 Hertz 3 – Maser (12"/mini CD 1995)
 Hertz 4 – Haloform (12"/mini CD 1995)
 Hertz 5 – Kaon (12"/mini CD 1995)
 Hertz 6 – Neper (12"/mini CD 1995)
 Firmament III (EP/CD 1996)
 Deliquescence (CD 1997) – live
 Firmament IV (EP/CD 1998)
 Transiency (mini CD – 2003)
 Ablation (Editions Mego – 2013)

Albums 
 Motion Pool (3LP/CD 1994)
 Hydra-Calm (LP/CD 1995) – re-issue of "Hydra" and "Calm", plus one inedit
 Ligature – Remixes (CD 1995) – re-issue, contains three extra tracks (the "Core" 7" single)
 Hz (3LP/2CD 1996) – re-issue of the whole "Hertz Project"
 Firmament III & IV (3 cd 1999) – re-issue of the Firmament III and Firmament IV EPs plus Deliquecence
 Tau (CD – 2002)
 Exosphere Exosphere (CD – 2003)
 Surcease (2006)

See also 
List of ambient music artists

References

External links 
 Robert Hampson discography

Musical groups established in 1991
English experimental musical groups
English post-rock groups
Dark ambient music groups
English alternative rock groups
British indie pop groups
Musical groups disestablished in 2006
1991 establishments in the United Kingdom
Situation Two artists
Beggars Banquet Records artists
Drone music groups